The women's 400 metre individual medley event at the 2000 Summer Olympics took place on 16 September at the Sydney International Aquatic Centre in Sydney, Australia.

Yana Klochkova blasted the world record to become Ukraine's first ever Olympic gold medalist in swimming. She pulled away from the rest of the field to hit the wall first with a blistering time of 4:33.59. Her spectacular swim shattered the previous global standard of 4:34.79, set by China's Chen Yan from the 1997 Chinese City Games in Shanghai, and lopped three seconds off an old, drug-tainted 1980 Olympic record from former East Germany's Petra Schneider. Japan's Yasuko Tajima kept the pressure on all the way and took the silver in 4:35.96. Storming from fifth at the halfway turn, Beatrice Câșlaru raced to bronze with a Romanian record of 4:37.18 on the rear of a dominant breaststroke leg.

For the first time in Olympic history, Kaitlin Sandeno shut out the medal podium for the Americans with a fourth-place time of 4:41.03. Germany's Nicole Hetzer finished fifth in 4:43.56, while Sandeno's teammate Maddy Crippen, swimming outside in lane eight, earned a sixth spot in 4:44.63. Canada's Joanne Malar (4:45.17) and Aussie favorite Jennifer Reilly (4:45.99) rounded out the historic finale.

Records
Prior to this competition, the existing world and Olympic records were as follows.

The following new world and Olympic records were set during this competition.

Results

Heats

Final

References

External links
Official Olympic Report

M
2000 in women's swimming
Women's events at the 2000 Summer Olympics